The men's single sculls competition at the 2018 Asian Games in Palembang, Indonesia was held from 19 August to 23 August at the JSC Lake.

Schedule 
All times are Western Indonesia Time (UTC+07:00)

Results

Heats 
 Qualification: 1 → Final A (FA), 2–6 → Repechage (R)

Heat 1

Heat 2

Repechages 
 Qualification: 1–2 → Final A (FA), 3–5 → Final B (FB)

Heat 1

Heat 2

Finals

Final B

Final A

References

External links 
Rowing at the 2018 Asian Games

Rowing at the 2018 Asian Games